FEANTSA, the European Federation of National Organisations working with the Homeless, is the only major European network that focuses exclusively on homelessness at European level and receives financial support from the European Commission for the implementation of its activities.  FEANTSA also works closely with other EU institutions, and has consultative status at the Council of Europe and the United Nations.

It monitors the scope and nature of homelessness in Europe, and national and local homeless policy-making in Europe in the framework of the European Commission's strategy on social protection and social inclusion. The organization's website offers information on the measurement of homelessness, health and homelessness, employment and homelessness, housing rights and homelessness, among others.

Presentation

Description 

FEANTSA is increasingly focusing on the urban dimension of EU policy namely through:
strengthened cooperation with local authorities in the European Forum to combat homelessness
cooperation with Eurostat for collecting data on homelessness for the Urban Audit
participating in debates on housing and regional policy in various EU institutions

Structure 

FEANTSA is democratically structured to involve member organisations in as many aspects of its work as possible.  The guiding bodies of FEANTSA are:
the General Assembly (involves all member organisations)
an Administrative Council (consists of one representative for each EU Member State)
an Executive Committee (consists of up to 7 members drawn from the Administrative Council)

FEANTSA has a small office based in Brussels which is responsible for the day-to-day operations of the network.

Working Groups 

FEANTSA runs a number of working groups, in which members discuss and analyse issues such as 
housing
housing rights
employment
health and social protection
data collection (statistics and indicators)
participation

Transnational Exchanges 

To promote and facilitate the exchange of information, experience and best practice between FEANTSA's member organisations. This exchange gives members access to effective and innovative approaches to the problem of homelessness through working groups and seminars.

To promote and facilitate exchanges between non-members (civil servants, local authorities, etc.) in the framework of the European Forum to combat homelessness which is made up of different sub-fora, including the local authorities forum on homelessness.

FEANTSA Annual Themes 

Each year, FEANTSA's Administrative Council designates a theme that will be woven into the work of FEANTSA for the coming twelve months. The concrete outcomes that FEANTSA produces on the annual theme are a policy statement, a report and a conference.  In general, one of the editions of the FEANTSA magazine Homeless in Europe is also dedicated to the same issue.

Research 

FEANTSA established the European Observatory on Homelessness in 1991 to facilitate research to promote better understanding of the complexity and the changing nature of homelessness. This network is composed of eleven national research correspondents from different EU countries who have built up extensive experience in the field of homelessness and housing exclusion.

The Observatory produces the European Journal of Homelessness and the European Review of Statistics on Homelessness.  The Journal provides a critical analysis of policy and practice on homelessness in Europe for policy makers, practitioners, researchers and academics.  The aim is to stimulate debate on homelessness and housing exclusion at the European level and to facilitate the development of a stronger evidential base for policy development and innovation.    The European Review of Statistics has two main objectives.  First, it collates the development of ideas relating to the measurement of homelessness and housing exclusion in Europe that were presented in previous publications of the European Observatory on Homelessness.  Second, it updates information on homelessness and housing exclusion for all those member states for which information is available.

The research outcomes of the Observatory have been put together in the European Journal of Homelessness since 2007.  From 2002 - 2006, reports were produced under the following headings:
European Statistics (2002–2006)
Policies on Homelessness in Europe (2003–2006)
Homelessness Research in the European Union (2002–2004)
European Thematic Reports (2003–2006)

Between 1995 and 2004, transnational reports in book form, were published on a number of subjects:

Immigration and Homelessness in Europe (2004)
Access to Housing (2002)
Women and Homelessness in Europe (2001)
Support and Housing in Europe (2000)
Services for Homeless People (1999)
Coping with Homelessness (1999)
Youth Homelessness in the European Union (1998)
The Invisible Hand of the Housing Market (1996)
Homelessness in the European Union (1995)

Partnerships 

FEANTSA works closely with the EU institutions, and has consultative status at the Council of Europe and at the United Nations. FEANTSA works closely with research networks such as the European Network on Housing Research. FEANTSA is a founding member of the European Housing Forum (a forum of European organisations active in the field of housing). FEANTSA is a member of the Platform of European Social NGOs, EAPN (European Anti Poverty Network) and EPHA (European Public Health Alliance).

In 2007, FEANTSA has won a case on the violation of right to housing in France before the European Committee of Social Rights, and one more case, against Slovenia, in 2010.

On 14 April 2010 at the European Parliament, Brussels FEANTSA launched a campaign called 'Ending Homelessness' with a hearing called 'Ending homelessness is possible! How can the EU effectively contribute to the fight against homelessness?' This event was co-organised by FEANTSA, Liz Lynne MEP, Britta Thomsen MEP, Karima Delli MEP, Ilda Figueiredo MEP, Jacek Protasiewicz MEP and Projekt Udenfor.

Members 

The some 100 member organisations of FEANTSA come from 30 European countries, including 24 Member States of the European Union. Members are non-governmental organisations that provide a wide range of services to people who are homeless including accommodation and social support. Most of the members of FEANTSA are national or regional umbrella organisations of service providers who work in close co-operation with public authorities, social housing providers and other relevant actors.

Objectives 

Role of FEANTSA: To provide a voice for NGOs.
Mission: To be/create the most effective means of ending homelessness in the EU.
Strategies/methods:
Influencing decision-making at EU level
Building capacity of members to lobby/influence the homelessness agenda nationally, and be aware of the impact of EU level policy-making at national level
Mutual learning with all partners who share the FEANTSA mission
Using research/expertise to provide solutions to homelessness

FEANTSA is committed to:
Engaging in constant dialogue with the European institutions and national and regional governments to promote the development and implementation of effective measures to fight homelessness.
Conducting and promoting research and data collection to better understand the nature, extent, causes of, and solutions to, homelessness.
Promoting and facilitating the exchange of information, experience and good practice between FEANTSA's member organisations and relevant stakeholders with a view to improve policies and practices addressing homelessness.
Raising public awareness about the complexity of homelessness and the multidimensional nature of the problems faced by homeless people.

Products 

FEANTSA homeless service providers produce various European thematic reports, policy statements and policy proposals.
The FEANTSA Observatory produces annual research in relation to homelessness (changing profiles, services, role of the state).

The FEANTSA magazine Homeless in Europe is published three times a year.  Each issue deals with a particular theme that is topical in relation to homelessness across Europe.  Contributors to the magazine include stakeholders, researchers, local authority representatives and experts from the EU institutions and other international bodies.

The FEANTSA Flash newsletter brings news from across Europe on issues related to housing and homelessness. News is gathered from FEANTSA members, the European institutions, International Organisations and the European press.

FEANTSA produces a number of tools and toolkits to help service users, researchers, local authorities etc., to better understand and tackle the problem of homelessness.

Involvement in EU policy-making 

FEANTSA mainly contributes to the following EU initiatives:
Social protection and inclusion strategy
Urban issues (Urban Audit, etc.)
Employment strategy
Services directives and debates
Health strategy
Housing Ministers meetings

See also

 Homelessness
 Forgotten man
 Street children
 Extreme poverty
 Internally displaced person
 Income inequality
 Basic income
 Human rights
 Right to housing
 Housing inequality
Deinstitutionalisation
Poverty

Social and governmental aids to homeless

 Emergency management
 Civil defense
 Homeless shelter
 Food bank
 Food Not Bombs
 Soup kitchen
 Cooling center
 Warming center
 Back on My Feet
 Dignity Village
 Frontline Foundation
 Tent city

Violence against homeless

 Discrimination against the homeless
 Anti-homelessness legislation
 Hostile architecture
 Blacklisting
 Silent treatment
 Closure (sociology)
 In-group–out-group bias
 Youth exclusion
 Social vulnerability
 Social alienation
 Second-class citizen
 Statelessness
 Camden bench

Emotional and physical effects of homelessness

 Trauma model of mental disorders
 Family estrangement
 Historical trauma
 Ostracism
 Social stigma

References

External links 
Official English website
OSW (Off the Streets and into Work) Research
 Bundesarbeitsgemeinschaft Wohnungslosenhilfe (Germany) Press
 Bundesarbeitsgemeinschaft Wohnungslosenhilfe (Austria) FEANTSA Press
European Commission, Employment and Social Affairs Directorate, Social Inclusion
 Fédération des Associations pour la Promotion et l'Insertion par le Logement, Europe
 Sdružení Azylových Domů
Caritas Slovenia
ETHOS Typology of Homelessness and Housing Exclusion

Europe
Non-profit organizations based in Europe